Lemuel Girard McDougal (October 30, 1894 – February 3, 1960) was an American Negro league pitcher between 1917 and 1920.

A native of Chicago, Illinois, McDougal made his Negro leagues debut in 1917 with the Indianapolis ABCs. He went on to play for the Chicago American Giants and Chicago Giants in 1919 and 1920. McDougal died in Chicago in 1960 at age 65.

References

External links
 and Baseball-Reference Black Baseball stats and Seamheads

1894 births
1960 deaths
Chicago American Giants players
Chicago Giants players
Indianapolis ABCs players
Baseball pitchers
Baseball players from Chicago
20th-century African-American sportspeople